Borane carbonyl is the inorganic compound with the formula H3BCO.  This colorless gas is the adduct of borane and carbon monoxide.  It is usually prepared by combining borane-ether complexes and CO.  The compound is mainly of theoretical and pedagogical interest.  It reacts with aqueous base to give boranocarbonate H3BCO22−.  Bond distances are B−C, 1.529; C−O, 1.140; 1.194 Å.  The H−B−H angle is 113.7°.  The CO vibrational band is at 2165 cm−1, 22 cm−1 higher than that of free CO.

Experimental data

Enthalpy of vaporization

Vibrational levels (cm−1) 

vibrational zero-point energy: 7826.5 cm−1 (from fundamental vibrations)

Rotational Constants (cm−1)

Geometric Data

Point Group C3v

Internal coordinates 
distances (r) in Å, angles (a) in degrees, dihedrals (d) in degrees

Cartesians

Atom - Atom Distances 
Distances in Å

Experimental Bond Angles 
(degrees) from cartesians

Bond descriptions 
Examples: C-C single bond, C=C, double bond, C#C triple bond, C:C aromatic bond

Connectivity

Electronic energy levels (cm−1)

Ionization Energies (eV)

Dipole, Quadrupole and Polarizability

Electric dipole moment

Electric quadrupole moment

References

References 

Boranes
Carbonyl complexes
Organoboron compounds